José Antonio Salcedo Sánchez (born 1 October 1990) is a Spanish footballer who plays for CD Guijuelo as a goalkeeper.

Club career
Born in Valdeganga, Albacete, Castile-La Mancha, Salcedo finished his formation with Albacete Balompié, but moved abroad in the 2009 summer after signing with Belgian Pro League club R.E. Mouscron. On 1 August 2009 he made his professional debut, starting in a 2–1 away win over K.R.C. Genk, but left in December due to unpaid wages.

On 27 January 2010 free agent Salcedo returned to Spain, joining Real Valladolid B. On 29 January of the following year he first appeared with the first team, playing the last 24 minutes in a 0–2 away loss against Villarreal CF B after Javi Jiménez was sent off.

On 31 July 2012 Salcedo moved to Huracán Valencia CF, in Segunda División B. However, he only appeared once in the league in the entire season, and subsequently joined fellow league side La Roda CF.

Salcedo subsequently resumed his career in the lower leagues, representing La Hoya Lorca CF, Mérida AD, CD Guadalajara, CF Rayo Majadahonda and CP Villarrobledo. With Guadalajara, he scored a last-minute equalizer in a 1–1 away draw against UD Almansa through a header, and also achieved promotion to the second division with the Majariegos in 2018.

References

External links

1990 births
Living people
Spanish footballers
Footballers from Castilla–La Mancha
Association football goalkeepers
Segunda División players
Segunda División B players
Tercera División players
Real Valladolid Promesas players
Real Valladolid players
Huracán Valencia CF players
Lorca FC players
Mérida AD players
CD Guadalajara (Spain) footballers
CF Rayo Majadahonda players
CP Villarrobledo players
CD Guijuelo footballers
Belgian Pro League players
Royal Excel Mouscron players
Spanish expatriate footballers
Expatriate footballers in Belgium
Spanish expatriate sportspeople in Belgium
La Roda CF players